Hypatopa simplicella is a moth in the family Blastobasidae. It is found in North America, including Iowa, Pennsylvania, Ontario, Nova Scotia, British Columbia, Quebec, Maine and Oklahoma.

References

Moths described in 1910
Hypatopa